Diana Yankey (in some sources "Dinah"; born 2 February 1967) is a retired Ghanaian athlete who specialized in the 100 metres hurdles. She represented her country at the 1987 World Championships in Athletics and the 1988 Summer Olympics. She was twice champion at the African Championships in Athletics and took silver medals at the 1987 All-Africa Games and the 1988 African Championships in Athletics.

International competitions

External links

1967 births
Living people
Ghanaian female hurdlers
Olympic athletes of Ghana
Athletes (track and field) at the 1988 Summer Olympics
Athletes (track and field) at the 1990 Commonwealth Games
Commonwealth Games competitors for Ghana
World Athletics Championships athletes for Ghana
African Games silver medalists for Ghana
African Games medalists in athletics (track and field)
Athletes (track and field) at the 1987 All-Africa Games
T.I. Ahmadiyya Senior High School (Kumasi) alumni
20th-century Ghanaian women
21st-century Ghanaian women